Hyderabad Garrison is a cantonment adjacent to Hyderabad in the Sindh province of Pakistan.

References

Cantonments of Pakistan